Finneid is a small town with a population of 210 (2016 census) that lies  southeast of Fauske in Nordland county, Norway.

Finneid was the port for shipping out the ore that came from the mine in Sulitjelma. The town formerly had hotels, boarding houses, and shops, but as mining in Sulitjelma declined most of the businesses established in Finneid closed down.

Finneid is connected to Fauske by European route E6 and to Sulitjelma by Norwegian County Road 830.

References

Populated places in Nordland
Fauske